This is a list of Japanese prefectures by GDP per capita.

List of prefectures by GDP per capita 
Prefectures by GDP per capita in 2018 according to data by the OECD.

References 

 GDP per capita
 GDP
GDP
Japan, GDP per capita
Prefectures by GDP per capita